Ramnagar Assembly constituency is an assembly constituency in Paschim Champaran district in the Indian state of Bihar. It is reserved for scheduled castes. It was earlier an open seat.

Overview
As per orders of Delimitation of Parliamentary and Assembly constituencies Order, 2008, 2. Ramnagar Assembly constituency (SC) is composed of the following:
Ramnagar and Gaunaha community development blocks.

Ramnagar Assembly constituency is part of 1. Valmiki Nagar (Lok Sabha constituency). It was earlier part of Bagaha (Lok Sabha constituency).

Members of Legislative Assembly

Election results

2020

2015

2010

References

External links
 

Assembly constituencies of Bihar
Politics of West Champaran district